Tramontano is a surname. Notable people with the surname include:

Aldo Tramontano (born 1981), Italian rower
Anna Tramontano (1957–2017), Italian computational biologist

See also
Castello Tramontano, a 16th century fortification in Matera